Brusno is a village and municipality in Banská Bystrica District in the Banská Bystrica Region of central Slovakia.

History
In historical records the village was first mentioned in 1402.

Geography
It has a population of about 2,114 people.

References

External links

 

Villages and municipalities in Banská Bystrica District